Wendemark is a village and former municipality in the district of Stendal, in Saxony-Anhalt, Germany. Since 1 January 2010, it is part of the municipality of Altmärkische Wische.

Former municipalities in Saxony-Anhalt
Altmärkische Wische